Detachment or detached may refer to:
 Single-family detached home, a structure maintained and used as a single dwelling unit.
 Emotional detachment, in psychology, refers to "inability to connect" or "mental assertiveness"
 Detachment (philosophy), the state of lacking material desire
 Detachment (military), a military unit which has left its parent unit altogether
 Detachment (territory), a concept in international law
 A term used in the United Kingdom for an enclave or exclave
 Detachment fault, geological term associated with large displacements
 Décollement, a geological term for a zone where rock units are detached from each other
 Detachment (film), a 2011 American film
 Detachments (British band), an art rock/electronic group
 Detached objects, objects which have orbits whose perihelia are sufficiently distant from the influence of Neptune so that they are only moderately affected by Neptune.

See also 
 Retinal detachment, a disorder of the retina
 Rule of detachment
 Law of detachment